Boleslaw Szczeniowski (20 July 1898 – 1985) was a Canadian aeronautical engineer and composer of Polish descent. A graduate of the school of engineering at Lviv Polytechnic, Szczeniowski made a living as an engineer  in Montréal. He published two books: Theory of the siphon jet (published by the National Advisory Committee for Aeronautics, 1955) and Theoretical analysis of combustion gases (Montreal, 1946).

As a composer and musician, Szczeniowski was largely self-taught. He composed a significant amount of vocal music and works for solo piano and a small amount of chamber music.

Compositions

Symphonic
Rustic Dance

Vocal music
 1954 The rainbow, - text: Marja Konopnicka
 1954 Will-o'the wisp, - text: Hanna Gross
 1955 Entends tu…/ Do you hear…, text: Mario Gross
 1955 Les tenebres/Dusk, - text: Mario Gross
 1955 Mon chant, - text: Mario Gress
 1955 Poranek/Morning, - text: Marja Konopnicka
 1956 Poeme, - text: Marc Gelinas
 1956 Little Jack Horner
 1958 La lune dans l'eau, - textt: Wilfrid Lemoine
 1958 Le petit lapin de la lune, - text: Cecile Duchene
 1958 Pierrot, - text: Wilfrid Lemoine
 1959 A poor young Sheppard - text: Paul Verlaine
 1959 Un grand sommeil noir, - text: Paul Verlaine
 1960 The house of the hill, - text: Edwin Arlington Robinson
 1961 Song for the rainy season, - text: Elizabeth Bishop
 1977 To the dog howling in the middle of the street, - text: Kazimierz Wierzynski
 Ashes - text: Kazimierz Wierzynski
 A door is closing - text: Hanna Gross
 A la clair fountaine
 A little love story/Un petit amour - text: Beata Obertynska
 Chanson des ivrognes, slow-boggie - text: Mario Gross
 Le ciel est par-dessus, text: Paul Verlaine
 Drinking song
 Fall, tekst: Hanna Gross
 Gra w lisa, Foxy - text: Marja Konopnicka
 Je voulais te dire
 Little rain, text: Marja Konopnicka
 Popiot, Ashes-Cendres - text: Kazimierz Wierzynski
 Rues desertes/Deserted streets, - text: Mario Gross
 To sleep, darling/Oj, usnij, - text: Marja Konopnicka
 Swialton, light-lumiere - text: Kazimierz Wierzynski
 Vision/Wizja, - text: Marja Konopnicka
 What lips my lips have kissed, - text: Edna St. Vincent Millay
 What should I sing you/A co wam spiewac, - text: Marja Konopnicka
 Winter ballad - text: Hanna Gross

Chamber music
String Quartet No. 1 (1956)
String Quartet No. 2 (1962)

Piano works
 1976 The Gentle Wind
 Seven Etudes
 For seconds - Allegro
 For thirds - Allegro
 For fourths - Andante
 For fifths - Andantino
 For sixths - Allegretto
 For sevenths - Andante
 For octaves - Largo
 Pieces
 Prélude
 Rite sauvage
 L'aube au Lac Noir
 Le caribou mourant
 Thème russe
 Thème ibérique
 Promenade aux chutes Darwin
 Le vent
 Le ruisseau
 Le moulin
 Labourage
 Songe
 La pluie
 Automne
 Une fontaine
 Une prière
 La course
 Le retour
 Une barque
 La nuit
 Thème polonais
 Le renard
 Berceuse
 Berceau
 Les hirondelles
 Été

Sources
Ronald Napier: A Guide to Canada's composers, Willowdale, Ontario: Avondale Press, 1973, p. 50
Storm Bull: Index to biographies of contemporary composers - Vol. II, Metuchen, N.J.: Scarecrow Press, 1974, 567 p.

1898 births
1985 deaths
Lviv Polytechnic alumni
Canadian male composers
Canadian aerospace engineers
20th-century Canadian composers
20th-century Canadian male musicians